The 38.1 cm/45 Model 1926 naval gun, also known as the Vickers-Armstrong 38.1 centimetres (15.0 in) Mark B, was originally intended to form the armament of the Brazilian battleship Riachuelo. Eighteen of the guns were subsequently purchased by Spain for use as coastal artillery.

They were mounted in individual armoured gun houses.

In the 1990s, seven mounts remained operational, and were provided with modern Swedish fire control equipment.

Locations 
Cartagena: 4 Guns. Batteries Castillitos and Cenizas, each with 2 guns (Guns still in situ).

Ferrol and A Coruña: Originally 8 guns. Batteries at Cape Prior (Guns scrapped 1997), Monte San Pedro (Guns still in situ), Campelo Alta (Guns transferred 1941) and Lobateiras (Guns removed), each with 2 Guns.

Menorca: Originally 6 guns. Batteries at Favarix (Guns transferred 1944), Mahon and Llucalary (guns still in situ), each with 2 guns.

Subsequently, the guns at Campelo Alta were moved to a new location at Paloma Alta, work being completed in October 1941. One of these guns was destroyed when it suffered a premature detonation during Proof Firing. Later the two guns from the Favarix Battery were transferred, becoming operational in January 1944. These three guns remained in service until 2008, when the last one finally retired into reserve.

Surviving examples 
West of Cartagena two guns of the Castillitos Battery :
 
 

East of Cartagena two guns of the de Las Cenizas Battery :
 
 

At Monte De San Pedro, W of A Coruña, two guns :
 
 

East of Cala Llucalari, Menorca, two guns :
 
 

At Bateria de Costa, Paloma Alta, W of Algeciras, two guns:

Notes

References

External links 
 Coastal Batteries of Cenizas and Castillitos

Coastal artillery
380 mm artillery
Spanish Army
Artillery of Spain